Garcia-Colace, Garcia Colace, Garcia y Colace, or, variant, may refer to:

 The Bella Twins, Garcia-Colace twins sisters pro-wrestling team of Brie and Nikki
 Brianna Monique Garcia-Colace (born 1983) twin pro-wrestler Brie Bella
 Stephanie Nicole Garcia-Colace (born 1983) twin pro-wrestler Nikki Bella

See also

 
 Colace (disambiguation)
 Garcia (disambiguation)